Von Hemmling is an Eponymous album by Von Hemmling. It was released by The Elephant 6 Recording Company.

Track listing
Happy Were Together – 1:30
Little Arabian Rurul – 1:19
Get It – 1:22
Tell Me Sweetie – 2:33
Me Thin – 1:00
Copper Kettle – 1:46
Drive Yr. Dad Insane - 1:30
Oh Jennifer - 1:59
Nannys B-Day III - 1:25
Kathouse - 2:02
Stripes & Buttons - 1:08
Cupcake Cake - 0:51
Lulu - 2:09
Cant Take The Rain - 1:44
Never Alone - 1:36
Turn Up The Heat - 1:40
Fall Open Eye Mockingbird - 0:40
Flairfies - 0:51
Beenus-Bonus - 0:59
Popper - Take - 2:28
Rainy - 1:46
Good For Girl - 1:14
Hon Denlle Don Hemml - 0:47

External links
Von Hemmling official site

1993 albums
The Elephant 6 Recording Company albums